Phytocosmetics is a part of cosmetology, which consists of using plants in cosmetics. The popularization of the use of plants in cosmetics is attributed to the fact that these additives do not need regulation, being considered safe by the Food and Drug Administration, in addition to providing different benefits offered by the vast composition of plants that for the most part are known and enshrined by popular medicine.

Bibliography
Corazza, Sonia. Green Cosmetic. Available at: https://web.archive.org/web/20120715174129/http://maisde50.com.br/editoria_conteudo2.asp?conteudo_id=5194
Simões, C. O. and col. Pharmacognosy of the plant to the medicine. Porto Alegre / Florianópolis: Ed. Do Rio Grande do sul / Ed. Ufsc. 5th Edition, 2004
Isaac, v.l.b. and col. Protocol for physico-chemical stability of based cosmetics. Rev. Ciênc. Farm. Basic Apl., v. 29, no. 1, p. 81-96, 2008.

References

Cosmetics